Pečje is a settlement in the Municipality of Sevnica in central Slovenia. It lies just east of Sevnica above the left bank of the Sava River  The area is part of the historical region of Styria. The municipality is now included in the Lower Sava Statistical Region.

Mass graves
Pečje is the site of two known mass graves associated with the Second World War. The Lončarjev Dol 1 and 2 mass graves are located southeast of the settlement, south of the neighboring village of Lončarjev Dol. The second grave is on the edge of a copse on the east side of the road.

Church
The local church is dedicated to Saint Margaret and belongs to the Parish of Sevnica. It was originally a Gothic building that was heavily rebuilt and restyled in the Baroque in the 17th century and again in the 19th century.

References

External links
Pečje at Geopedia

Populated places in the Municipality of Sevnica